Shahram Jalilian (born 1978 in Khorramshahr, Iran) is an Iranian Iranologist and historian.
His higher education was in Shahid Beheshti University and took his doctorate in History of Ancient Iran at the University of Tehran. He is now the Associate Professor in the history of Ancient Iran at Shahid Chamran University of Ahvaz.

Books
 Shahram Jalilian, Bisotun, Tehran: 2012
R.S. Murray, Ancient Iran, Translated by, Tehran: Faravahar Publication, 2001.
 Touraj Daryaee, Cities of Iranshahr, Translated by Shahram Jalilian, Tehran: Toos Publication, 2010.
 Matthew Stolper, History of Elam, Translated by Shahram Jalilian, Tehran: Toos Publication, 2011.
 Alireza Shapour Shahbazi, An Essay About a symbol of the Achaemenid؛ Ahvrhmzda, Khvrnh or Faravahar? Translated by Shahram Jalilian, Tehran: Shirazeh Publication, 2011.
 Touraj Daryaee, On the Explanation of Chess and Backgammon , Translated by, Tehran: Toos Publication, 2013.

See also 
Iranology
Persian history

References

External links

1978 births
Living people
21st-century Iranian historians
Iranian essayists
Iranian Iranologists
Iranian translators
Faculty of Letters and Humanities of the University of Tehran alumni
Academic staff of Shahid Chamran University of Ahvaz